FUN14 domain containing 1 is a protein that in humans is encoded by the FUNDC1 gene.

Model organisms

Model organisms have been used in the study of FUNDC1 function. A conditional knockout mouse line, called Fundc1tm1a(KOMP)Wtsi was generated as part of the International Knockout Mouse Consortium program — a high-throughput mutagenesis project to generate and distribute animal models of disease to interested scientists — at the Wellcome Trust Sanger Institute.

Male and female animals underwent a standardized phenotypic screen to determine the effects of deletion. 
Twenty two tests were carried out on mutant mice, however no significant abnormalities were observed.

References

Further reading 
 

Genes mutated in mice